Andro is the third solo album by Mötley Crüe drummer Tommy Lee. It was released on October 16, 2020.

Background
Lee plays drums, produces, and provided background vocals but every track has a guest lead vocalist. The guest vocalists include Post Malone, Shotty Horroh and Mickey Avalon.
All the singles featured Music videos.

Track listing

Charts
Album

References

2020 albums
Tommy Lee albums